Fyam (Pyem, Gye, Fyem) is a Plateau language of Nigeria.

References

Blench, Roger. 2010. Plural verbs in the languages of Central Nigeria.

Languages of Nigeria
East Plateau languages